Events from the year 1506 in India.

Events
 March – Battle of Cannanore (1506)
 Siege of Anjadiva (1506)
 The new city of Agra was founded

Births
 7 April, Francis Xavier, Roman Catholic missionary active in India is born (dies 1555)

Deaths

See also
 Timeline of Indian history

References

 
India